Oskar Svärd (born September 19, 1976 in Tvärred, Sweden is a Swedish cross-country skier. He is best known for winning the Vasaloppet three times (2003, 2005, 2007). In January 2010, he won Marcialonga.

Cross-country skiing results
All results are sourced from the International Ski Federation (FIS).

World Cup

Season standings

References

External links
Official Website

Swedish male cross-country skiers
Vasaloppet winners
1976 births
Living people